Austin Thomas Slater (born December 13, 1992), nicknamed AC, is an American professional baseball outfielder for the San Francisco Giants of Major League Baseball (MLB). He played college baseball at Stanford University. He was drafted by the Giants in the eighth round of the 2014 MLB draft. He made his MLB debut in 2017.

High school and college 
Slater attended The Bolles School in Jacksonville, Florida. He broke his ankle while playing frisbee, and did not play his senior year. He was drafted as a shortstop by the Los Angeles Dodgers in the 44th round of the 2011 Major League Baseball draft.

He did not sign, and instead played college baseball at Stanford University, batting .310 with five home runs and 72 RBIs in 113 career games during three seasons. Slater played for the Hyannis Harbor Hawks of the Cape Cod Baseball League in the summers of 2013 and 2014, and was named a league all-star in 2013. After his junior year, he was drafted by the San Francisco Giants in the eighth round of the 2014 MLB draft, and signed for a $200,000 signing bonus.

Professional career

Draft and minor leagues
Slater made his professional debut in 2014 with the Arizona League Giants and was promoted to the Salem-Keizer Volcanoes after two games. In 31 games between both teams, he batted .346 with two home runs and 25 RBIs. He was moved from outfield to second base in 2015.

He spent 2015 with the San Jose Giants and Richmond Flying Squirrels where he posted a .294 batting average with three home runs and 47 RBIs in 114 games between both teams. He was a CAL mid-season All Star.  After the season, the Giants assigned him to the Scottsdale Scorpions of the Arizona Fall League (AFL).

Slater was moved back to the outfield in 2016 and started the year back with Richmond, and was later promoted to the Sacramento River Cats. In 109 games between both teams, he posted a combined .305 batting average with 18 home runs and 67 RBIs. He was an MiLB  2016 organization All Star. Slater played for the Scorpions of the AFL after the regular season. He began 2017 with Sacramento.

San Francisco Giants

2017-19
On June 2, 2017, the Giants promoted Slater to the major leagues. He made his debut later that night, starting at right field against the Philadelphia Phillies. Slater recorded his first career hit and RBI in the sixth inning in the same game. He spent the remainder of the season with the Giants after his promotion, batting .282/.339/.402 with three home runs and 16 RBIs in 117 at bats in 34 games.

He began 2018 with Sacramento, with whom he batted .344/.417/.564 with five home runs and 32 RBIs in 195 at bats, and stole seven bases without being caught. He was an MiLB  2018 organization All Star. In 2018 with the Giants he batted .251/.333/.307 with one home run and 23 RBIs in at 199 bats.

He played part of 2019 with Sacramento again, batting .308/.436/.529 with 12 home runs and 45 RBIs in 240 at bats. In 2019 with the Giants, playing primarily right field he batted .238/.333/.417 with five home runs and 21 RBIs in 168 at bats.

2020–present
In 2020 with the Giants he batted .282/.408/.506 with 18 runs, 5 home runs, and 7 RBIs in 85 at bats. Slater stole eight bases (10th in the NL) in nine attempts (his 88.89% stolen base percentage was 5th-best in the NL).

Avoiding arbitration, Slater and the Giants agreed on a $1.15 million salary for the 2021 season. In the 2021 regular season, he batted .241/.320/.423 with 39 runs, 12 home runs, and 32 RBIs in 274 at bats, and stole 15 bases in 17 attempts (his 88.24% success rate led the National League). As a pinch hitter, he led the major leagues with 13 RBIs, and tied for the major league lead with four home runs. He primarily played center field, with stints in left field and right field (his perfect fielding percentage led all NL outfielders), and one game as a pitcher.

In 2022 he batted .264/.366/.408 in a career-high 277 at bats, with 49 runs, seven home runs, 34 RBIs, and 12 stp;em bases om 13 attempts. He played 106 games in center field, 44 as a pinch hitter, 16 in left field, 14 in right field, 7 as a pinch runner, and two as a DH. He batted 10-for-30 as a pinch hitter, with 11 walks and three hit-by-pitch (.333/.546/.500). His 10 pinch hits were second in the major leagues, and his six pinch RBIs tied for fifth.

On January 13, 2023, Slater agreed to a one-year, $3.2 million contract with the Giants, avoiding salary arbitration.

Personal life
Slater was born and raised in Jacksonville, Florida.  He was named after his grandfather, Ed Austin, who was Mayor of Jacksonville from 1991–95.

References

External links

Stanford Cardinal bio

1992 births
Living people
Baseball players from Jacksonville, Florida
Major League Baseball outfielders
San Francisco Giants players
Stanford Cardinal baseball players
Arizona League Giants players
Salem-Keizer Volcanoes players
San Jose Giants players
Richmond Flying Squirrels players
Scottsdale Scorpions players
Sacramento River Cats players
Toros del Este players
American expatriate baseball players in the Dominican Republic
Hyannis Harbor Hawks players